The Department of Physiology, Development and Neuroscience, (PDN) is a part of the School of Biological Sciences at the University of Cambridge. Research in PDN focuses on three main areas: Cellular and Systems Physiology, Developmental and Reproductive Biology, and Neuroscience and is currently headed by Sarah Bray and William Colledge. The department was formed on 1 January 2006, within the School of Biological Sciences at the University of Cambridge from the merger of the Departments of Anatomy and Physiology. The department hosts the Centre for Trophoblast Research and has links with the Cambridge Centre for Brain Repair, the Cambridge Stem Cell Institute, and the Gurdon Institute.

Senior staff in the department
 the department has 25 Professors, ten of whom are Fellows of the Royal Society (FRS).

 Horace Barlow FRS
 Andrea Brand FRS
 Dennis Bray
 Sarah Bray
 Nick Brown
 Graham Burton
 Roger Carpenter
 William Henry Colledge
 Andrew Crawford FRS
 Abigail Fowden
 Dino Giussani
 Roger Hardie FRS
 William A Harris FRS
 Christine Holt FRS
 Chris Huang
 Martin Johnson FRS
 Randall S Johnson
 Roger Keynes
 Jenny Morton
 Ole Paulsen
 Angela Roberts
 Wolfram Schultz FRS
 Azim Surani FRS
 Roger C Thomas FRS
 Magdalena Zernicka-Goetz

History
Anatomy was taught within the university since its foundation in about 1231. Initially, the teaching was of a theoretical nature based on readings of the classical texts of Galen, but the subject became established as an academic discipline in the early 16th century. In 1707 the first Professor of Anatomy, George Rolfe, was appointed. The tenth Professor of Anatomy, George Humphry, appointed in 1866, was a founder of the Journal of Anatomy and Physiology, and during the early tenure of his office, anatomy and physiology were taught together.

In 1870 Michael Foster was appointed as Praelector in Physiology. In 1878, the university supplied Foster with a purpose-built laboratory on the east side of Downing Street. Though Foster's contributions to research were not enduring, he was an inspirational teacher and is the academic "great grandfather" to a large fraction of the world's current physiologists. In 1883 Foster became the first Professor of Physiology, Cambridge University.

Notable alumni
The Departments of Anatomy and Physiology (now fused to make PDN) and have been the home of many exceptional contributors to medical and physiological sciences and Nobel Prizes including 
 Edgar Adrian (1932)
 Henry Dale (1936)
 Alan Hodgkin (1963)
 Andrew Huxley (1963)
 Roger Y. Tsien (2008)
  Robert G. Edwards (2010)

References

Physiology, Development and Neuroscience, Department of